Zalaegerszeg is the administrative center of Zala county in western Hungary.

Location

History

The area was already inhabited in the Upper Paleolithic, according to archaeological findings (the oldest ones in Zala county). Later, the area was inhabited by Celts.

The first written mentions of the town are as Egerscug (1247) and Egerszeg (1293); the name means "alder-tree corner" and is probably a reference to the town's situation in the angle where two rivers meet. King Béla IV donated the town to the diocese of Veszprém in 1266, so that it became Church property. As Egerszeg lay somewhat distant from Veszprém, however, the taxes paid by the town often ended up in the pockets of such local oligarchs as the Kőszegi family.

In the 14th century, Egerszeg was the largest town of the area. Between 1368 and 1389, it was a royal town for a short time, then Sigismund I donated it to the Kanizsai family who traded it for another town with the bishop of Veszprém. Zalaegerszeg remained their property until 1848.

In 1381, the town built a stone church. In 1421, Egerszeg was granted oppidum status, which meant they could pay taxes once a year and the citizens could elect their own judge. The population grew quickly, and by the 16th century, Egerszeg became the de facto centre of Zala comitatus.

In the 1530s, development was brought to a halt. Taking advantage of the power of the king being weakened, the owners of the surrounding lands attacked the town often, and the Ottomans already began to occupy Hungary after the Battle of Mohács in 1526. From 1568, the town was fortified, a castle was built. The Ottomans attacked the town for the first time in the late 1570s, but they failed to capture it.

After Kanizsa fell to the Ottomans, the strategic importance of Egerszeg grew, but the castle was severely damaged in 1616 and captured by the Ottomans for a short time in 1664. The citizens suffered not only from the war, but from plagues and heavy taxes as well.

Egerszeg, even though it was on the periphery of the comitatus, became its capital in the 18th century, mostly because the councils were always held there, because of its importance in the Ottoman times and because it wasn't the estate of a local lord, unlike the other towns in Zala. The county hall was built between 1730 and 1732 in Baroque style, and for a long time it was the only significant building of the town. In the 1760s a large church and a barracks was built. Most of the citizens still did not own stone-built houses, and fires often destroyed the town, until 1826, when stone buildings were built.

Until the early 19th century, there were only a few craftsmen and merchants in the town, because they had to pay taxes to the bishop who owned the city. By the 1830s 10% of the residents of the mostly Catholic town were Jewish, but even they did not give a boost to trade. Because of this, even though the town was the centre of administration, economically and culturally it wasn't really important. Even though it had about 3,500 residents, it had only two primary schools. The cultural centres of the comitatus were Kanizsa and Keszthely.

Zalaegerszeg played only a minor role in the revolution and freedom fight in 1848–49. In 1870, it lost its town status and became a village, which meant a decrease in prestige, even more so, since Nagykanizsa kept its town status. On 31 May 1885 Zalaegerszeg became a town again. In 1887, the village of Ola was annexed to the town. In 1890, the railway line between Ukk and Csáktornya (now Čakovec) connected Zalaegerszeg to the railway system of the country. In 1895, several new buildings were built, including a new secondary school, a town hall, a hotel, a nursery school and a brick factory, but the town ran into debt and the mayor, Károly Kovács had to resign. His successor, Lajos Botfy decreased the debt and could continue the development of the town, but in the early 20th century Zalaegerszeg was still behind the other county seats in many ways.

The representative at the Hungarian Parliament József Farkas de Boldogfa was person of deep catholic and monarchist convictions, although he was a very tolerant and also responsible Parliament Representative: On December 12, 1901, József Farkas de Boldogfa led a delegation to Budapest to meet personally Baron Gyula Wlassics de Zalánkemén (1852–1937) Minister of Religion and Education with the purpose of asking his support for building a Synagogue on Zalaegerszeg, relying on the fact that the minister, as a Zalaegerszeg native, is well aware of the situation of the local Jews' community. A couple of years after these negotiations the Synagogue of Zalaegerszeg was finished in 1904.

The 1920s brought prosperity again; new buildings included the new post office, the railway station, the office of the fire department, the police headquarters, the monastery of the Notre Dame Order and a synagogue in Baroque style.

The most significant loss in World War II was the deportation of the 1221 Jewish citizens to Auschwitz. The city was freed from the Nazis by the Red Army on 28 March 1945. In the next local elections in 1949, the local branch of the Communist party got only about 10% of the vote, but they still became the leaders of the city.

The 1950s brought important changes. Zalaegerszeg got a more industrial profile with the construction of the textile factory and the discovery of oil resources in 1952. The railway line was expanded, too. Many workers were commuting from the nearby villages, because it was almost impossible to find a flat in the city, so several residents of Zalaegerszeg (mostly those who were considered to be opposed to the Socialist system) were forced to relocate.

The citizens took part in the revolution in 1956. The revolution in the city began on 26 October. The communist local government fled to Körmend, and until the arrival of the Soviet troops (November 4) the city was governed by the Revolutionary Council.

In the 1960s and 1970s, the city experienced a demographic explosion. Several new flats were built, new residents moved into them, and the growing city absorbed many surrounding villages (Csácsbozsok, Botfa, Zalabesenyő, Bazita, Andráshida, and Pózva). Albeit at a slower pace, it continues to expand toward the settlements of Bocfölde and Bagod.

After the end of Socialism, Zalaegerszeg wasn't affected by economic recession as much as other cities were. The 1990s brought dynamic development to the city.

Zalaegerszeg hosted the 1983 World Orienteering Championships. In 2001, Zalaegerszeg hosted the Central European Olympiad in Informatics (CEOI). Zalaegerszeg also hosted the 2004 European Women's Handball Championship preliminary round, the 2005 UEFA Women's Under-19 Championship and the 2005 European Fencing Championships.

Main sights

 Roman Catholic church (Baroque)
 Old county hall (18th century)
 Hevesi Sándor Theatre
 Göcsej Museum and open-air museum
 Museum of Oil Industry
 Kisfaludi Strobl collection
 Bazita Peak TV Tower

Sport
 Zalaegerszegi TE, local football team
 Zalakeramia-ZTE KK Professional Basketball team

Demographics

In 2001, Zalaegerszeg had 61,654 inhabitants (95.5% Hungarian, 1% Romani, 0.4% German...). The distribution of religions were, 71.1% Roman Catholic, 3.8% Calvinist, 1.6% Lutheran, 11.6% Atheist (2001 census).

Politics 
The current mayor of Zalaegerszeg is Zoltán Balaicz (Fidesz-KDNP).

The local Municipal Assembly, elected at the 2019 local government elections, is made up of 18 members (1 Mayor, 12 Individual constituencies MEPs and 5 Compensation List MEPs) divided into this political parties and alliances:

Notable people
 Ferenc Deák (1803–1876), member of parliament, minister of justice
 László Dús (1941-), artist
 Miklós Gábor (1919–1998), actor
 Dezső Keresztury (1904–1996), critic, literary historian
 Zsigmond Kisfaludi Strobl (1884–1975), sculptor
 Károly Kovács (1839–1904), mayor
 József Mindszenty (1892–1975), cardinal, archbishop of Esztergom
 Lajos Portisch (1937-), chess player
 Gyula Wlassics (1852–1937), minister of education
 Lajos Vajda (1908–1941), painter
 László Andor (*1966) EU-Commissioner

Twin towns – sister cities

Zalaegerszeg is twinned with:

 Baraolt, Romania
 Berehove, Ukraine
 Dobrich, Bulgaria
 Gorizia, Italy
 Kherson, Ukraine
 Klagenfurt, Austria
 Krosno, Poland
 Kusel, Germany
 Lendava, Slovenia
 Marl, Germany

 Surgut, Russia
 Târgu Mureş, Romania
 Varaždin, Croatia
 Varkaus, Finland
 Zenica, Bosnia and Herzegovina

References

Notes

External links

 The official website of Zalaegerszeg
 Aerial photography: Zalaegerszeg
 Zalaegerszeg at funiq.hu

 
County seats in Hungary
Cities with county rights of Hungary
Populated places in Zala County